Juan Velasco (1910–1977) was a left-leaning Peruvian general who ruled Peru from 1968 to 1975 under the title of "President of the Revolutionary Government."

Juan Velasco may also refer to:

 Juan Fernández de Velasco, 5th Duke of Frías (c. 1550–1613), Spanish diplomat
 Juan Fernando Velasco (born 1972), Ecuadorian musician
 Juan Velasco Damas (born 1977), Spanish footballer
 Juan Zambudio Velasco (1921–2004), Spanish footballer
 Juan de Velasco (1727–1792), Jesuit priest, historian, and professor of philosophy and theology